Tumchi Mulgi Kay Karte? is an Indian Marathi language drama series. It starred Madhura Velankar, Jui Bhagwat and Harish Dudhade in lead roles. It is produced by Manava Naik under the banner of Strawberry Pictures. It premiered from 20 December 2021 on Sony Marathi by replacing Vaidehi - Shatjanmache Apule Nate and ended on 15 February 2023.

Cast 
 Madhura Velankar as Shraddha
 Jui Bhagawat as Savani
 Harish Dudhade as Inspector Bhosale
 Chandralekha Joshi as Inspector Jamdade
 Nitin Bhajan as ACP Sherekar
 Sanjay Mone
 Kshitee Jog
 Manava Naik
 Meera Joshi
 Ashish Kulkarni
 Vidya Karanjikar
 Sharvari Lohokare
 Madhugandha Kulkarni

Dubbed version

References

External links 
 
 Tumchi Mulgi Kay Karte? at SonyLIV
 
Marathi-language television shows
2021 Indian television series debuts
2023 Indian television series endings
Sony Marathi original programming